Christmas in Tahoe is the eighth studio album and first Christmas album by American rock band Train, released on November 13, 2015 by Sunken Forest Records. The album was made digitally available exclusively on Amazon at the time of its release, as well as being released on CD to most retailers. The album features renditions of twelve traditional Christmas songs and three originals written by the band.

The album was released by other digital retailers on October 27, 2017, and a deluxe edition was made available on CD.
The non-deluxe stock release contains a lyric sheet that mirrors the first 12 songs but not the last three. The tracks that are on this CD are the first 12 listed on the deluxe edition.

In 2021, the Hallmark Channel aired a film, Christmas in Tahoe, based on the album. Pat Monahan of Train co-starred and was executive producer on the film.

Track listing

Personnel
Credits adapted from AllMusic

Train
 Pat Monahan — vocals, arrangement
 Jerry Becker — keyboards
 Hector Maldonado — bass, percussion, and background vocals
 Luis Carlos Maldonado  — guitar and background vocals
 Drew Shoals — drums
 Nikita Houston — background vocals
 Sakai Smith — background vocals

Other musicians
 Mike Davis — French horn, trombone
 Jeff Kievit — French horn, trumpet
 Lisa Kim — concertmaster, strings
 David Mann — horn, alto saxophone
 Rob Mathes — horn, strings
 Suzanne Ornstein — leader, strings, violin
 Victoria Parker — violin
 Phillip A. Peterson — cello, strings
 Robert Rinehart — leader, strings, viola
 Roger Rosenberg — French horn, baritone saxophone
 Andy Snitzer — French horn, tenor saxophone
 Alan Stepansky — cello, leader, strings
 Aidan James — ukulele

Technical
 John Goodmanson — production
 Alex Venguer — engineer
 Michael Brauer — mixing
 Casey Catelli — photography
 Joe LaPorta — mastering
 Rob Mathes — conductor, string arrangements
 Mikey Ortiz — package design
 Sandra Park — contractor
 Phillip A. Peterson — arrangement
 Steve Vealey — mixing assistant

Charts

Release history

References

2015 Christmas albums
Albums produced by John Goodmanson
Christmas albums by American artists
Pop rock Christmas albums
Train (band) albums